Ellorum Vazhavendum is a 1962 Indian Tamil language film directed by G. Viswanathan. The film stars K. Balaji and Malini. M. R. Radha is a guest artiste. Music was scored by Rajan–Nagendra. The film was produced under the banner S. R. S. Pictures.

Plot

Cast 

Male Cast
 M. R. Radha (Guest)
 K. Balaji
 Kuladeivam V. R. Rajagopal
 S. A. Ashokan
 Pulimoottai Ramasami
 V. M. Ezhumalai
 Sayeeram
 S. K. Ramaraj
 R. M. Sethupathi
 K. Kannan
 Nagesh
 A. P. S. Mani

Female Cast
 Malini
 T. K. Rajeswari
 K. V. Shanthi
 Renuka Devi
 Jupitor Rathnam
 Lalitha
Dance
 Egyptian Brunette Laila

Soundtrack 
Music was composed by Rajan–Nagendra and the lyrics were written by Villiputhan and Muthukoothan.

Reception 
The Indian Express said on 30 March 1962, "The film has the usual quota of songs and dances of about the average standard." Kalki called M. R. Radha the "star" of the film, but said Malini and Rajeswari were underused.

References

External links 
 

1960s Tamil-language films
1962 films
Films scored by Rajan–Nagendra
Indian black-and-white films